The 44th District of the Iowa House of Representatives in the state of Iowa.

Current elected officials
Kenan Judge is the representative currently representing the district.

Past representatives
The district has previously been represented by:
 James D. Wells, 1971–1973
 Conrad R. Fisher, 1973–1975
 Joyce Lonergan, 1975–1983
 Andy McKean, 1983–1993
 Robert C. Arnould, 1993–1995
 Neil P. Harrison, 1995–1997
 Ronald J. Kinzer, 1997–1999
 John Sunderbruch, 1999–2001
 Cindy Winckler, 2001–2003
 Polly Granzow, 2003–2009
 Annette Sweeney, 2009–2013
 Rob Taylor, 2013–2019
 Kenan Judge, 2019–present

References

044